Vyacheslav Vasilyevich Sukristovas (Russian: Вячеслав Васильевич Сукристов; Lithuanian: Viačeslavas Sukristovas; born 1 January 1961 in Vilnius) is a former Soviet and Lithuanian footballer and a current manager.

Honours
 UEFA Euro 1988 runner-up.
 Soviet Top League bronze: 1987.
 A Lyga bronze: 1990.

International career
Sukristov made his debut for USSR on 23 March 1988 in a friendly against Greece. He was selected for the UEFA Euro 1988 squad, but did not play in any games at the tournament. He later played for Lithuania.

External links
Profile (in Russian)

1961 births
Living people
Lithuanian footballers
Lithuanian expatriate footballers
Lithuania international footballers
Sportspeople from Vilnius
Soviet footballers
Soviet expatriate footballers
Soviet Union international footballers
UEFA Euro 1988 players
Dual internationalists (football)
Lithuanian people of Russian descent
Soviet Top League players
FK Žalgiris players
FC Lokomotiv Moscow players
Beitar Tel Aviv F.C. players
Maccabi Netanya F.C. players
Maccabi Herzliya F.C. players
Hapoel Ramat Gan F.C. players
Hapoel Haifa F.C. players
Bnei Yehuda Tel Aviv F.C. players
Soviet expatriate sportspeople in Israel
Lithuanian expatriate sportspeople in Israel
Expatriate footballers in Israel
Lithuanian football managers
Association football defenders
Association football midfielders